Al-Samarrai is an Arabic surname common in Iraq. Notable people with the surname include:

 Ahmad Husayn Khudayir as-Samarrai, Iraqi politician
 Ayad al-Samarrai, Iraqi politician
 Sarmed al-Samarrai, Iraqi actor
 Wafiq al-Samarrai, Iraqi general

See also
 Abdul-Aziz al-Samarrai

Arabic-language surnames